Onthophagus adelaidae is a species of beetle discovered by Frederick William Hope in 1846. No sub-species are listed at Catalogue of Life.

References

Scarabaeinae